Lin Wei-shan is a Taiwanese businessman. He is the present chairman and president of Tatung Company, which his grandfather  founded in 1918. He took over the presidency from his father  on 17 March 2006. However, his wife  is widely considered as the de facto executor in Tatung.

References

External links
Lin Wei-shan's message at Tatung official site

1946 births
Living people
Taiwanese businesspeople
Tatung University alumni